Shorty is a feature on Earth's Moon, an impact crater in the Taurus–Littrow valley. Astronauts Eugene Cernan and Harrison Schmitt visited it in 1972, on the Apollo 17 mission. It is the location of the famous "orange soil", which geologists believe to be small bits of rapidly-cooled molten rock ejected in a fire fountain.

To the east of Shorty are Victory, Camelot, and the Apollo 17 landing site.  To the southeast is Brontë. To the southwest are Lara and Nansen.

The crater was named after the character "Shorty" in Richard Brautigan's 1967 novel Trout Fishing in America, as well as to honor the genre of the short story with particular reference to J. D. Salinger.

References

External links

VR panorama
LROC article, with overhead views
43D1S2(25) Apollo 17 Traverses at Lunar and Planetary Institute
Geological Investigation of the Taurus-Littrow Valley: Apollo 17 Landing Site

Impact craters on the Moon
Apollo 17
Harrison Schmitt
Gene Cernan